Yilin may refer to:

Fan Yilin (born 1999), Chinese artistic gymnast and uneven bars specialist
Lin Yilin (born 1964), Chinese performance artist
Tsai yilin (born 1980), Taiwanese singer, songwriter, and actress
Wang Yilin (born 1956), Chinese business and oil magnate
Wei Yilin (1277–1347), Chinese physician and surgeon
Xie Yilin (born 1990), also known as Evonne Sie, Taiwanese actress
Yang Yilin (born 1992), retired Chinese artistic gymnast
Yao Yilin (1917–1994), Vice Premier of the People's Republic of China from 1979 to 1988
Yin Yilin (born 1981), Singaporean blogger and activist
Zhan Yilin (born 1989), Chinese football player
Zhou Yilin (born 1992), Chinese competitive swimmer
Yilin Zhong, British Chinese journalist, screenwriter and author

See also
Choo Yilin, Singapore-based fine jewelry company founded in 2009
Jiaoshi Yilin, a Chinese book of divination composed during the Western Han Dynasty
Yilin Press, an academic publishing house, a division of Phoenix Publishing & Media, Inc